David Enoch Beem House, also known as the "Beem Mansion" and "The Hill", is a historic home located in Spencer, Owen County, Indiana.  Built in 1874, the large, two-story, Italianate-style residence is named after its original owner, David Enoch Beem, a local lawyer and banker, and his family. The T-plan, brick dwelling rests on a rusticated Indiana limestone foundation and arched openings framed in limestone.  It features a three-story, central tower at the entrance with a steeply pitched mansard roof. The home was listed on the National Register of Historic Places in 1989.

References

Houses on the National Register of Historic Places in Indiana
Italianate architecture in Indiana
Houses completed in 1874
Buildings and structures in Owen County, Indiana
National Register of Historic Places in Owen County, Indiana